The Roman Catholic Archdiocese of Santa Fe de Antioquia is an archdiocese located in the city of Santa Fe de Antioquia in Colombia.

History
8 August 1804: Established as Diocese of Antioquía from the Diocese of Cartagena, Diocese of Popayán and Metropolitan Archdiocese of Santafé en Nueva Granada
5 February 1917: Renamed as Diocese of Antioquía – Jericó
3 July 1941: Renamed as Diocese of Antioquía, because Jericó was erected as separate diocese
18 June 1988: Promoted as Metropolitan Archdiocese of Santa Fe de Antioquia

Bishops

Ordinaries
 Bishops of Antioquía 
Fernando Cano Almirante, O.F.M. † (21 Dec 1818 – 19 Dec 1825) Confirmed, Bishop of Islas Canarias
Mariano Garnica y Orjuela, O.P. † (21 May 1827 – 10 Aug 1832) Died
José María Estévez † (Appointed 19 Dec 1834; Died before appointment)
Juan de la Cruz Gómez y Plata † (24 Jul 1835 – 1 Dec 1850) Died
Domingo Antonio Riaño Martínez † (13 Jan 1854 – 20 Jul 1866) Died
Joaquín Guillermo González † (21 Mar 1873 – 9 Aug 1883) Resigned
Jesús María Rodríguez Balbín † (9 Aug 1883 – 30 Jul 1891) Died
Juan Nepomuceno Rueda Rueda † (30 Jan 1892 – 1900) Resigned
José Maria Villalba † (25 Sep 1900 – 1901) Died
Manuel Antonio López de Mesa † (30 May 1902 – 15 May 1908) Died
Maximiliano Crespo Rivera † (18 Oct 1910 – 7 Feb 1917) Appointed, Appointed, Bishop of Santa Rosa de Osos
 Bishops of Antioquía – Jericó 
Francisco Cristóbal Toro † (8 Feb 1917 – 3 Jul 1941) Appointed, Bishop of Antioquía
 Bishops of Antioquía
Francisco Cristóbal Toro † (3 Jul 1941 – 16 Nov 1942) Died
Luis Andrade Valderrama, O.F.M. † (16 Jun 1944 – 9 Mar 1955) Resigned
Guillermo Escobar Vélez † (1 Apr 1955 – 28 Jul 1969) Resigned
Eladio Acosta Arteaga, C.I.M. † (6 Mar 1970 – 18 Jun 1988) Appointed, Archbishop of Santa Fe de Antioquia
 Archbishops of Santa Fe de Antioquia
Eladio Acosta Arteaga, C.I.M. † (18 Jun 1988 – 10 Oct 1992) Resigned
Ignacio José Gómez Aristizábal (10 Oct 1992 – 12 Jan 2007) Resigned
Orlando Antonio Corrales García (12 Jan 2007 – 3 May 2022) Resigned

Auxiliary bishop
Guillermo Escobar Vélez † (1952-1955), appointed Bishop here

Suffragan dioceses
 Apartadó 
 Istmina–Tadó
 Quibdó
 Santa Rosa de Osos

See also
Roman Catholicism in Colombia

Sources

External links
 GCatholic.org

Roman Catholic dioceses in Colombia
Roman Catholic Ecclesiastical Province of Santa Fe de Antioquia
Religious organizations established in 1804
Roman Catholic dioceses and prelatures established in the 19th century
1804 establishments in the Viceroyalty of New Granada
Santa Fe de Antioquia